The Filmfare Critics Award for Best Actor is given by Filmfare as part of its annual Filmfare Awards for Hindi films.

Superlatives
The record of the maximum number of wins in this category is with Amitabh Bachchan having won the award 4 times (2002, 2006, 2016 & 2021), then Manoj Bajpai 3 times (1999, 2000 & 2017), followed by four actors (in chronological order): Shahrukh Khan (1994 & 2001), Ranbir Kapoor (2010 & 2012), Rajkummar Rao (2014 & 2018) and Ayushmann Khurrana (2019 & 2020). 

 There have been two ties in this category's history, between Manoj Bajpai and Shahid Kapoor for Aligarh and Udta Punjab respectively (2017); and between Ayushmann Khurrana and Ranveer Singh for Andhadhun and Padmaavat respectively (2019).

 2 actors have won the award in consecutive years; they are Manoj Bajpai (1999 & 2000) and Ayushmann Khurrana (2019–20).

 4 actors have won both the Popular and Critics categories in the same year, three for the same film: Hrithik Roshan for Koi... Mil Gaya in 2004, Amitabh Bachchan for Black in 2006 and Ranbir Kapoor for Rockstar in 2012. Shah Rukh Khan is the first and only actor so far to win both categories in the same year in 1994 for 2 different films, with Best Actor (Popular) for Baazigar and Best Actor (Critics) for Kabhi Haan Kabhi Naa.

 Aamir Khan, Shah Rukh Khan, Hrithik Roshan, Shahid Kapoor, Ranbir Kapoor and Ranveer Singh have all won awards also for Best Male Debut and Best Actor while Ayushmann Khurrana has won for Best Male Debut and Best Male Playback singer.

 Anil Kapoor, Irrfan Khan, Rishi Kapoor, Anupam Kher and Amitabh Bachchan have all won awards for Best Actor and Best Supporting Actor while Rajkummar Rao has won Best Supporting Actor.

 Ajay Devgn (The Legend of Bhagat Singh), Amitabh Bachchan (Black and Piku), Rajkummar Rao (Shahid), Irrfan Khan (Paan Singh Tomar) and Ayushmann Khurrana (Andhadhun) have all won the National Film Award for Best Actor, while Anupam Kher (Daddy) received a National Film Award – Special Jury Award / Special Mention (Film Critic) and Manoj Bajpai (Satya) and Pankaj Kapoor (Maqbool) have won National Film Award for Best Supporting Actor.

Multiple Wins 
 4 wins: Amitabh Bachchan
 3 wins: Manoj Bajpai
 2 wins: Shah Rukh Khan, Ranbir Kapoor, Rajkummar Rao, Ayushmann Khurrana

List of winners

Filmfare Critics Award for Best Performance
(From 1991 until 1997, there was one special category known as the Critics Award for Best Performance, and was awarded without prior nomination to acknowledge an actor of either gender.)

1990s
 1991 Anupam Kher – Daddy as Anand 
 1992 Not awarded
 1993 Won by a female actor
 1994 Shah Rukh Khan – Kabhi Haan Kabhi Naa as Sunil 
 1995 Won by a female actor
 1996 Won by a female actor
 1997 Won by a female actor

Filmfare Critics Award for Best Actor
(The category is officially divided into two separate categories to acknowledge both male and female actors individually.)

 1998 Anil Kapoor – Virasat as Shakti Thakur 
 1999 Manoj Bajpai – Satya as Bhiku Mhatre

2000s
 2000 Manoj Bajpai – Shool as Inspector Samar Pratap Singh 
 2001 Shah Rukh Khan – Mohabbatein as Raj Aryan Malhotra 
 2002 Amitabh Bachchan – Aks as Insp. Manu Verma 
 2003 Ajay Devgan – Company & The Legend of Bhagat Singh as N. Malik (in Company) / Bhagat Singh (in The Legend of Bhagat Singh) 
 2004 Hrithik Roshan – Koi... Mil Gaya as Rohit Mehra 
 2005 Pankaj Kapoor – Maqbool as Jahangir Khan (Abbaji) 
 2006 Amitabh Bachchan – Black as Debraj Sahai 
 2007 Aamir Khan – Rang De Basanti as Daljit "DJ" Singh 
 2008 Darsheel Safary – Taare Zameen Par as Ishaan Awasthi aka Inu 
 2009 Manjot Singh – Oye Lucky! Lucky Oye! as Young Lucky

2010s
 2010 Ranbir Kapoor – Wake Up Sid, Ajab Prem Ki Ghazab Kahani & Rocket Singh: Salesman of the Year as Siddharth "Sid" Mehra (in Wake Up Sid) / Prem Shankar Sharma (in Ajab Prem Ki Ghazab Kahani) / Harpreet Singh Bedi (in Rocket Singh: Salesman of the Year) 
 2011 Rishi Kapoor – Do Dooni Chaar as Santosh Duggal 
 2012 Ranbir Kapoor – Rockstar as Janardhan "Jordan" Jhakhar / JJ 
 2013 Irrfan Khan – Paan Singh Tomar as Paan Singh Tomar 
 2014 Rajkummar Rao – Shahid as Shahid Azmi 
 2015 Sanjay Mishra – Ankhon Dekhi as Bauji
 2016 Amitabh Bachchan – Piku as Bhashkor Banerjee 
 2017 Manoj Bajpai – Aligarh as Prof. Ramchandra Siras and Shahid Kapoor – Udta Punjab as Tejinder "Tommy" Singh a.k.a. Gabru 
 2018 Rajkummar Rao – Trapped as Shaurya
Irrfan Khan – Hindi Medium' as Raj Batra 
Rajkummar Rao – Newton as Nutan "Newton" Kumar
Ranbir Kapoor – Jagga Jasoos as Jagga
Vikrant Massey – A Death in the Gunj as Shyamal Chatterjee (Shutu)
 2019 Ayushmann Khurrana – Andhadhun as Akash Saraf and Ranveer Singh – Padmaavat as Alauddin Khalji Nawazuddin Siddiqui – Manto as Saadat Hasan Manto
Ranbir Kapoor – Sanju as Sanjay Dutt
Varun Dhawan – October as Danish "Dan" Walia
Vineet Kumar Singh – Mukkabaaz as Shravan Kumar Singh

2020s
 2020 Ayushmann Khurrana – Article 15 as Additional SP Ayan Ranjan Akshaye Khanna – Section 375 as Tarun Saluja
Nawazuddin Siddiqui – Photograph as Rafiullah / "Rafi"
Rajkummar Rao – Judgementall Hai Kya as Keshav Kumar / Shravan

 2021 Amitabh Bachchan – Gulabo Sitabo as Chunan "Mirza" Nawab Gajraj Rao – Shubh Mangal Zyada Saavdhan as Shankar Tripathi
Irrfan Khan – Angrezi Medium as Champak Ghasiteram Bansal
Rajkummar Rao – Ludo as Alok “Alu” Kumar Gupta
Sanjay Mishra – Kaamyaab as Sudhir
Shardul Bhardwaj – Eeb Allay Ooo! as Anjani Prasad

 2022 Vicky Kaushal – Sardar Udham as Udham Singh'''
Abhishek Bachchan – Bob Biswas as Bob Biswas
Pratik Gandhi – Bhavai as Raja Ram Joshi
Ranveer Singh – 83 as Kapil Dev
Vikrant Massey – Haseen Dilruba'' as Rishabh Saxena

See also
Filmfare Awards
Bollywood
Cinema of India

References

External links
 Filmfare Nominees and Winners

Actor, Critics